The Benmore Valley AVA is an American Viticultural Area located in southwestern Lake County, California.  The valley is named for Benjamin Moore, a local 19th century cattle rustler.  The valley is a high depression in the mountains of southwestern Lake County, and is much cooler than surrounding areas.  There are no wineries or planted vineyards in the AVA as of February 2018, and most of the grapes produced there were previously used by Geyser Peak Winery.

References

 ]

American Viticultural Areas
American Viticultural Areas of California
Geography of Lake County, California
1991 establishments in California